Ostap Prytula (born 24 June 2000) is a professional Ukrainian football midfielder who plays for Rukh Lviv.

Career
Prytula was born in Lviv, Western Ukraine and is a product of the local FC Pokrova and FC Karpaty Lviv School Sportive Systems.

He made his debut for FC Karpaty as the main-squad player in the draw home match against SC Dnipro-1 on 23 February 2020 in the Ukrainian Premier League.

References

External links

2000 births
Living people
Sportspeople from Lviv
Ukrainian footballers
Association football defenders
Ukrainian Premier League players
Ukrainian Second League players
FC Karpaty Lviv players
FC Rukh Lviv players
Ukraine youth international footballers